Sobek is the Egyptian crocodile deity.

Sobek may also refer to:

Egypt
 Satsobek, an Egyptian queen whose name means "Daughter of Sobek"
 Sobekhotep (disambiguation), various meanings derived from an Egyptian name meaning "Sobek is pleased"
 Sobekneferu, a Pharaoh whose name means "Beauty of Sobek"

People
 Hanne Sobek (1900–1989), German international footballer
 Joseph Sobek (1918–1998), American inventor of racquetball
 Paweł Sobek (1929–2015), Polish footballer
 Werner Sobek (born 1953), German architect and structural engineer
 House R 128, also known as Sobek House, a building designed by Werner Sobek
 Jeanine Sobek (born 1972), women's ice hockey player from Minnesota

Other
 The Skull of Sobek, a 2008 Doctor Who audio drama
 Sobek (comics), a DC Comics character
 Sympistis sobek, a species of moth
 SobekCM, software engine and tools for digital libraries

See also

 
 
 Sebec (disambiguation)
 Sebek (disambiguation)